"The Quartermaster's Store" is a traditional song from England. It is Roud Folk Song Index no. 10508. The origins of both tune and words are uncertain. It was sung by British and ANZAC soldiers during World War I, but may be an older song of the prewar British regular army, or even have origins dating back to the English Civil War in the 17th century. In those World War I armies, the quartermaster's department was responsible for stores and supplies. The song lists its supposed characteristics, many of them slovenly or unhygienic. The song was known in the United States by the 1930s; it was sung by the Lincoln Battalion, a unit of American volunteers who fought on the republican side in the Spanish Civil War (1936-39). During World War II, the song was popular in the RAF as well as the Army. The song is also known as The Quartermaster Corps or The Quartermaster's Corps.  See http://awe.mudcat.org/@displaysong.cfm?SongID=4834.

The song has gained wide popularity outside the military sphere, particularly as a campfire song in the Scouting and Guiding movements. The Barmy Army, supporters of the England cricket team, have been known to sing about England international cricketers Stuart Broad and his father Chris to the tune of "The Quartermaster's Store".

As is common in oral tradition, the words vary widely; and it being a list song, there have been many verses. The military versions are often earthier than those intended for children or teenagers. Two typical military verses are:

The song has been recorded several times:
Murgatroyd and Winterbottom (Tommy Handley and Ronald Frankau), British comedians, as a novelty song
1940sPete Seeger, American folksinger
1959?Les Cleveland and the D-Day Dodgers, New Zealand
1960The Shadows, British instrumental band, as the B-side of the No. 1 single "Apache"; Columbia DB4484
1964Burl Ives, American singer, on the album Scouting Along with Burl Ives
1979Raffi, Canadian singer-lyricist, on the album The Corner Grocery Store, as "The Corner Grocery Store"
1985The Band of the Royal Corps of Signals, as an item in a musical medley
Other recordings have been made

References

British songs
Songs of World War I
Satirical songs
List songs
English children's songs